Sabatinca doroxena is a species of moth belonging to the family Micropterigidae. It is endemic to the North Island of New Zealand. This small moth has a colourful forewing pattern with stripes and dots evident. It has been hypothesised that the forewing pattern is intended to resemble a jumping spider in order to allow the adult moth to escape predation. Adults of this species are on the wing from the beginning of September until mid January. It prefers damp but sunny habitat in deep forest, at the forest edge or in open shrubland. Larvae feed on foliose liverwort species including on Heteroscyphus normalis. Adults of this species have been located at the blossoms of flowering Cordyline and Ranunculus species.

Taxonomy

It was described by Edward Meyrick in 1888 using a specimen collected in the Waitākere Ranges in Kauri forest in December and was originally named Palaeomicra doroxena. In 1912 Meyrick placed this species within the genus Micropardalis. Both George Hudson in his 1928 book The Butterflies and Moths of New Zealand and J. S. Dugdale in his 1988 Catalogue of New Zealand Lepidoptera used the name Micropardalis doroxena when discussing this species. In 2014 the taxonomy of this species was revised and it was placed within the genus Sabatinca. As a result, this species is now known as Sabatinca doroxena. The holotype specimen is held in the Natural History Museum, London.

Description

Meyrick described the adults of the species as follows:

Adults have a black wing margin decorated with shining silver spots and various diagonal bands. It has been hypothesised that the pattern is intended to represent a face-on view of a jumping spider. Instead of waiting motionlessly, it is thought the spider would be tempted to signal to an image of another spider, thus allowing the moth to escape predation. Barcoding has established that S. doroxena is closely related to S. aurella.

Distribution 
This species is endemic to and found throughout the North Island of New Zealand.

Behaviour 
Adults of this species are on the wing from the beginning of September until mid January.

Host species and habitat 
This species prefers damp but sunny habitat and can be found within deep forest, at the forest edge or in open shrubland. Larvae feed on foliose liverwort species including on Heteroscyphus normalis. Adults of this species have been located at the blossoms of flowering Cordyline and Ranunculus species.

References

Micropterigidae
Moths described in 1888
Moths of New Zealand
Endemic fauna of New Zealand
Taxa named by Edward Meyrick
Endemic moths of New Zealand